Niniane Wang is an American software engineer and technology executive. In her early career at Google, Wang co-created Google Desktop and created Google Lively. She was previously vice president of engineering of Niantic after her company Evertoon was acquired by Niantic in 2017.

Early life and career 
Wang went to school in New Mexico and Nevada. At fifteen years old, she attended the California Institute of Technology, where she received a bachelor's degree. While studying for a master's degree in computer science at the University of Washington, she worked as an engineering team leader on Microsoft's Flight Simulator.

Career

Google 
Wang worked at Google for five years starting in 2003. There she was an engineering manager of products such as Gmail and co-founded Google Desktop, winning a Google Founders' Award for the latter. In a 2008 post on Google's official blog, Wang announced Google Lively, a web-based virtual world officially part of Google Labs. Wang explained that she developed Lively as a "20% Project", referring to Google's practice of allocating a portion of its employees' paid work time towards personal projects. Google planned to make Lively into a platform for developers to create games, but ultimately discontinued the service after five months in December 2008.

Minted 
For four years after she left Google, Wang was chief technology officer of Minted, an online marketplace that crowdsources designs for paper products such as stationery and wall art. During this time, in 2010, Wang and Yishan Wong founded the Sunfire Offices coworking space in Mountain View, California.

Evertoon and Niantic 
Wang founded the company Evertoon in 2016. Evertoon's mobile app allowed users to produce short animated films. Evertoon raised $1.7 million in venture capital financing and released its app in November 2016.

In June 2017, Wang was one of six women who accused venture capitalist Justin Caldbeck of sexual harassment. Initially denying the allegations, Caldbeck resigned from his position at Binary Capital four days later.

In November 2017, American software developer Niantic acquired Evertoon and hired its team of five employees. The Evertoon app was shut down later that month. After the acquisition, Wang became Niantic's vice president of engineering, where she oversaw products including Ingress and Harry Potter: Wizards Unite.

Basis Set Ventures 
Wang currently serves as the chief technology officer of Basis Set Ventures, a venture capital fund.

References 

American women engineers
American computer businesspeople
American women computer scientists
American computer scientists
American computer programmers
American women chief executives
American Internet company founders
American women company founders
American online retailer founders
21st-century American engineers
21st-century women engineers
Google employees
Microsoft employees
California Institute of Technology alumni
University of Washington alumni
Living people
Year of birth missing (living people)
21st-century American women